John Thorpe or Thorp (c.1565–1655?; fl.1570–1618) was an English architect.

Life
Little is known of his life, and his work is dubiously inferred, rather than accurately known, from a folio of drawings in the Sir John Soane's Museum, to which Horace Walpole called attention, in 1780, in his Anecdotes of Painting; but how far these were his own is uncertain.

He was engaged on a number of important English houses of his time, and several, such as Longleat, have been attributed to him on grounds which cannot be sustained, because they were built before he was born. In 1570 when he was five years old, he laid the foundation stone of Kirby Hall, Northamptonshire his father being the Master mason of the project. He was probably the designer of Charlton House, in Charlton, London; the original Longford Castle, Wiltshire; Condover Hall and the original Holland House, Kensington; and he is said to have been engaged on Rushton Hall, Northamptonshire, and Audley End, Essex (with Bernard Janssens).

Thorpe's major-but-little-trumpeted contribution to world architecture is the humble and now-ubiquitous corridor "for a house in Chelsea", London, England, in 1597, allowing "independent access to individual rooms". Previously, the fashion was the so-called enfilade arrangement of rooms in a dwelling in which each room led to the next via connecting internal doors. The enfilade remained popular in continental Europe long after the corridor was widely adopted in England. Flanders believes Thorpe's inspiration was the one-sided covered walkway common in monastic cloisters. Given their similarities, this is a reasonable prima facie conjecture.

Thorpe joined the Office of Works as a clerk, then practised independently as a land surveyor. In August 1605 the Earl of Dorset wrote to "Mr Thorpe" to survey and make "plots" for the rebuilding of Ampthill for Anne of Denmark and Prince Henry.

From 1611 he was assistant to Robert Tresswell, Surveyor-General of Woods South of the Trent.  He retired in the 1630s but seems to have lived to an advanced age, dying around 1655.

Architectural works
 the Jacobean Royal extension at Apethorpe Palace, Northamptonshire 
Aston Hall, Aston
Audley End, Essex
Bramshill House, Hampshire (attributed)
Thornton College, Lincolnshire, for Sir Vincent Skinner c1607-1610
Charlton House, London
Holland House, Kensington
Kirby Hall, Northamptonshire
Longford Castle, Wiltshire
Rushton Hall, Northamptonshire
Somerhill House, Kent

Gallery

Notes

References

 H. M. Colvin, A Biographical Dictionary of British Architects, 1600–1840 (1997) 

16th-century English architects
1650s deaths
Year of birth uncertain
17th-century English architects